Walferdange is a commune and small town in central Luxembourg.

Geography 
The commune of Walferdange is located north of Luxembourg City in the valley of the Alzette. It is part of the canton Luxembourg.

The town of Walferdange lies in the center of the commune, other towns within the commune include Helmsange and Bereldange.

History 
The commune of Walferdange was formed on 1 January 1851, when it was detached from the commune of Steinsel.  The law forming Walferdange was passed on 25 November 1850.

Although the commune first came into existence in 1851, there is evidence of prehistoric settlement as well as remains of a very large Roman villa.  The Raschpëtzer Qanat, an underground aqueduct near Helmsange was built in the 1st century AD during the Roman occupation. It is said to be the longest qanat north of the Alps.

Walferdange church was built between 1845 and 1852; the main features of its classical facade are two large statues of Père Kolbe and Thérèse de Lisieux, added at a later date.  Before official unification of the commune, and even before this church was built, it was religion that pulled the villages of Heisdorf, Helmsange, Bereldange and Walferdange together.

Recognition of Walferdange as an important town came in 1850, when Prince Henry, brother of Grand Duke William III, chose Walferdange as his seat of residence. 
After the independence of the Grand Duchy of Luxembourg in 1867, the Walferdange Castle was assigned to Grand Duke Adolphe according to the constitution.  As an engaged winemaker, he enthusiastically served his guests wine from his own production. The palace was later vacated by the Grand Ducal family.

Population

Places of interest 

Sights include the Roman villa and the underground aqueduct Raschpëtzer Qanat, as well as the Walferdange Castle. Until 2015 the residential palace housed the Faculty of Languages and Literature, Humanities, Art and Behavioral Sciences of the University of Luxembourg.

Sports
Walferdange is home for many sport clubs, including BBC Résidence (basketball), RSR Walfer (volleyball), De Renert (rugby union), FC Résidence Walfer (football), Tennis Club Résidence Walfer (tennis) and Optimists Cricket Club (cricket).

Cricket
The Pierre Werner Cricket Ground, also known as the Walferdange Cricket Ground, is situated in Helmsange next to the Alzette river. The cricket ground is the premier cricket venue in Luxembourg, being the home ground of the country's top club, the Optimists Cricket Club (OCC). It is named after the Pierre Werner, former Prime Minister of Luxembourg (1959–74, 1979–84).  Werner had fallen in love with cricket when living in London in 1930, and went on to become the Honorary President of the OCC, which had been established when he was Prime Minister.  Werner opened the OCC's new ground in 1992.

Pidal 
PIDAL which means in french Piscine intercommunale de l’Alzette, is a swimming pool including a spa area, a sauna, a fitness room and a restaurant.

The facility is managed by the communes of Lorentzweiler, Steinsel and Walferdange.

Culture
The Harmonie Grand-Ducale Marie-Adélaïde (Walfer Musek), named after Marie-Adélaïde, Grand Duchess of Luxembourg, has been founded in 1912.

Population 

According to the website of the municipality, Walferdange has about 8 030 inhabitants at the beginning of 2016. More than 51% are foreigners of about 90 different nationalities.

Official statistics 1821 - 2015

Transport 

Walferdange is connected to the outside world by means of Walferdange railway station, national highway N7, and several buslines, including the city of Luxembourg buslines (AVL) 11 and 10.

The commune also has its own mini-bus service known as "Walfy-Flexibus".

Twin towns — sister cities

Walferdange is twinned with:
 Schmitshausen, Germany
 Longuyon, France
 Limana, Italy

References

External links 
 
  

 
Communes in Luxembourg (canton)
Towns in Luxembourg
Alzette